David Harris (born in August 1961) is a New Zealand software developer from Dunedin, New Zealand. He developed the Pegasus Mail client and the Mercury Mail Transport System, and is a former staff member of the University of Otago. He wrote columns for Computerworld between 2000 and 2004.

David received a Lifetime Achievement Award at the PC World Awards in Auckland on
15 November 2002.

References

External links
 Pegasus Mail
 Mercury Mail Transport System
 David Harris's nomination for the Internet Council of New Zealand

1961 births
Living people
Scientists from Dunedin
New Zealand computer programmers
New Zealand computer scientists